Dagudumuthala Dampathyam is a 1990 Indian Telugu-language comedy film, produced by Bogavalli Prasad and directed by Relangi Narasimha Rao. Starring Akkineni Nageswara Rao, Rajendra Prasad, Sharada, Vani Viswanath, Ramya Krishna, and music composed by M. M. Keeravani. The film recorded as Super Hit at the box office.

Plot
The film begins with an ideal couple Raja Shekaram (Akkineni Nageswara Rao) & Lalitha (Sharada) who successfully completed 15 years of marital life. Once they learn that their intimate insider Gopalam (Gummadi) is distressed about his daughter Rekha (Vani Viswanath). A headstrong woman refuses to marry for the pampering of paternal uncle Major Narasimham (Satyanarayana) resides in Hyderabad. At Present, Raja Shekaram & Lalitha land in Hyderabad and makes a play as unmarried individuals. Lalitha accommodates at Narasimham's house with the help of Gopalam and Raja Shekaram joins as a tenant in their opposite house. Here, Raja Shekaram is acquainted with a Rikshawala Kishtaiah (Rajendra Prasad) who silently loves Rekha. The couple senses it and succeeds to unite him with Rekha by pretending as lovers. Just after, as a flabbergast, a woman Radha (Ramya Krishna) arrives, claiming herself as Raja Shekaram's wife with complete pieces of evidence. Thereupon, Raja Shekaram makes various attempts to falsify her but fails and Lalitha too believes it. Parallelly, Radha struggles to get nearer Raja Shekaram but he denies her when she is traumatized. So, Raja Shekaram makes a plan by showing affection toward her and moves on a tour. Being cognizant of it, Lalitha divulges the reality that nobody admits and considers her as mad. Meanwhile, Raja Shekaram makes Radha normal when surprisingly he discovers her as the sister of Kistaiah. Immediately Raja Shekaram backs up along with Gopalam, breaks out the fact, and seeks Kishtaiah for the reason behind his deed then he starts narrating the past. Radha has been wedlock with a person Raja Shekaram (again Akkineni Nageswara Rao) one that resembles this Raja Shekaram without knowledge of Kishtaiah. Unfortunately, Radha's husband died in an accident. Since Radha's condition is brittle, Kishtaiah has to bid the act to protect her. Besides, Lalitha steps to commit suicide. At last, they save her and affirm the actuality. Finally, the movie ends on a happy note with the marriage of Kishtaiah & Rekha.

Cast
Akkineni Nageswara Rao as Raja Shekaram
Rajendra Prasad as Kishtaiah
Sharada as Lalitha
Vani Viswanath as Rekha
Ramya Krishna as Radha
Satyanarayana as Major Narasimham
Gummadi as Gopalam
Suthi Velu as Dr. Tikka Makka Rao
Raavi Kondala Rao as Prof. Bhairava Murthy
Ashok Kumar as Madman
Y. Vijaya as Sundaramma
Nirmalamma as Seetamma

Crew
Art: Bhaskar Raju
Choreography: Taara
Stills: Sabastian Brothers
Dialogues: Satyanand 
Lyrics: Veturi
Playback: S. P. Balasubrahmanyam, Mano, Chitra, Ramola
Music: M. M. Keeravani
Story: Srinivasa Chakravarthy
Editing: Kotagiri Venkateswara Rao
Cinematography: Sarath 
Producer: Bogavalli Prasad
Screenplay - Director: Relangi Narasimha Rao
Banner: Sri Vijaya Prasanna Pictures
Release Date: 1990

Soundtrack

Music was composed by M. M. Keeravani. Lyrics were written by Veturi. Music released on Surya Music Company.

References

External links

1990s Telugu-language films
Indian comedy films
Films directed by Relangi Narasimha Rao
Films scored by M. M. Keeravani
1990 comedy films
1990 films